The race is an American Thoroughbred horse race held annually at Aqueduct Racetrack in Queens, New York. It was called the Aqueduct Handicap, but beginning in 2009, the name was changed to the Evening Attire Stakes in honor of the great grey gelding Evening Attire. He raced until he was 10 years old, retiring in 2008. The race is an ungraded stakes event run on dirt at a distance of  miles, it is open to horses three years old and up.

On November 28, 2007, this Grade III stakes race was downgraded to an ungraded stakes by the American Graded Stakes Committee.

Originally named for the racetrack where the inaugural race took place in 1902, until recently, it was mostly run on Labor Day but now is held in January. (It was run in late February in 2015.) The race did not take place from 1910 through 1916, 1924, 1956 through 1958, 1969 through 1972, 1974–1975, and in 1979. The 2010 edition marked its 91st running.

In 1961, the Aqueduct Handicap was run at Belmont Park.

The race was renamed the Aqueduct Stakes from 1962 to 1965 and in 1967 and 1968. In 1973 it was restricted to 2-year-old horses and was won by Cannonade who went on to win the 1974 Kentucky Derby.

On January 17, 2009 it was run as the Evening Attire Stakes.

The race's distance has been altered four times:
  miles : 1920 through 1924
  miles : 1917 through 1919, 1926 through 1932, and from 1961 through 1973
 1 mile : 1976
  miles : 1977 to present

Winners of the Evening Attire Stakes since 1959

* Sun Edwin (1930), Dominus (1933), King's Swan (1988), and Shots Are Ringing (1992) all finished first but were disqualified.

Earlier winners 

1955 – Icarian
1954 – Crash Drive
1953 – First Aid
1952 – Bryan G.
1951 – Bryan G.
1950 – Wine List
1949 – Wine List
1948 – Stymie
1947 – Stymie
1946 – Coincidence
1945 – New Moon
1944 – Alex Barth
1943 – With Regards
1942 – Pictor
1941 – Ponty
1940 – War Dog
1939 – Volitant
1938 – Isolater
1937 – Caballero II
1936 – Action
1935 – Good Gamble
1934 – Coequel
1933 – Golden Way
1932 – Blenheim III
1931 – Curate
1930 – Black Mammy
1929 – Sun Beau
1928 – Chance Play
1927 – Black Maria
1926 – Black Maria
1925 – Dazzler
1923 – My Play
1922 – Prince James
1921 – Damask
1920 – John P. Grier
1919 – Lucullite
1918 – Corn Tassel
1917 – Roamer
1909 – Firestone
1908 – Monfort
1907 – Brookdale Bymph
1906 – Rye
1905 – Bedouin
1904 – Israelite
1903 – Wild Thyme
1902 – Glenwater

References
 Aqueduct's official website

Open mile category horse races
Previously graded stakes races in the United States
Horse races in New York City
Recurring sporting events established in 1902
Sports in Queens, New York
Aqueduct Racetrack
1902 establishments in New York City